Sigbjørn Mustad (19 April 1897 – 30 October 1970) was a Norwegian lawyer and politician for the Conservative Party.

He was born in Vardal as a son of Kristian Mauritz Mustad (1848–1913) and Maren Haugsrud (1860–1917). He was elected to the Storting during the period 1937–1945. During the German occupation of Norway he was assigned with the Norwegian governmental administration in London. From 1946 he was appointed presiding judge in Agder Court of Appeal. He chaired the board of A/S Union from 1947 to 1963. He published the book Utenlands i krigsårene in 1958, and Union i 17 år.

References

1897 births
1970 deaths
20th-century Norwegian lawyers
Members of the Storting
Politicians from Gjøvik
Conservative Party (Norway) politicians
Norwegian expatriates in England
Norwegian World War II memoirists